DFW Airport Terminal A is a transit station located at Dallas/Fort Worth International Airport. It offers service on the DART  light rail service. It is the connection point to the TEXRail system and a future connection to the DART Silver Line service.

The light rail station opened on August 18, 2014, and it serves as the northwestern terminus of the Orange Line. It is located between International Parkway and North Service Road, in the area between Terminals A and B. A covered walkway connects the station with the lower level of Terminal A at Door A10 (named after nearby Gate A10).

With the opening of DFW Airport Terminal B station on January 10, 2019, a second covered walkway was built that connects the two stations together making it possible for passengers to transfer between DART or TEXRail or directly access Terminal B.

Passengers can access all other terminals using the SkyLink train inside the secured area of the airport, or the Terminal Link bus system outside of the secured area.

The station offers connections to Trinity Metro route 31, the TRE Link, which boards on the arrivals level of Terminal B and offers service to CentrePort/DFW Airport station on the Trinity Railway Express commuter rail line. FlixBus intercity coaches also board from the covered walkway between this station and the Terminal B station.

References

External links 
Dallas Area Rapid Transit

Airport railway stations in the United States
Dallas Area Rapid Transit light rail stations
Railway stations in the United States opened in 2014
2014 establishments in Texas
Dallas/Fort Worth International Airport
Railway stations in Tarrant County, Texas